XQ, X.Q., or Xq can refer to:

 SunExpress, a Turkish airline (IATA code XQ)
 XQ, a model of Daewoo Royale car
 XQ-1, a variant of Radioplane Q-1 drone aircraft